Huntingdon County is a county in the Commonwealth of Pennsylvania. As of the 2020 census, the population was 44,092. Its county seat is Huntingdon. The county was created on September 20, 1787, mainly from the northern part of Bedford County, plus an addition of territory on the east (Big Valley, Tuscarora Valley) from Cumberland County.

Huntingdon County comprises the Huntingdon, PA Micropolitan Statistical Area.

Geography
It has a humid continental climate (Dfa/Dfb) and average monthly temperatures in Huntingdon borough range from 27.8 °F in January to 72.3 °F in July.

Features
 Raystown Lake
 Tussey Mountain

Adjacent counties
 Centre County (north)
 Mifflin County (east)
 Juniata County (east)
 Franklin County (southeast)
 Fulton County (south)
 Bedford County (southwest)
 Blair County (west)

Demographics

As of the census of 2010, there were 45,913 people and 17,280 households within the county.  The population density was 52 people per square mile (20/km2).  There were 22,365 housing units at an average density of 24 per square mile (9/km2).  The racial makeup of the county was 92.50% White, 5.21% Black or African American, 0.09% Native American, 0.40% Asian, 0.01% Pacific Islander, 0.87% from other races, and 0.92% from two or more races.  1.58% of the population were Hispanic or Latino of any race. 33.9% were of German, 17.1% American, 11.1% Irish, 7.5% English and 5.7% Italian ancestry.

There were 16,759 households, out of which 30.10% had children under the age of 18 living with them, 58.10% were married couples living together, 8.30% had a female householder with no husband present, and 29.60% were non-families. 25.80% of all households were made up of individuals, and 12.30% had someone living alone who was 65 years of age or older.  The average household size was 2.44 and the average family size was 2.92.

In the county, the population was spread out, with 21.70% under the age of 18, 10.10% from 18 to 24, 29.40% from 25 to 44, 24.00% from 45 to 64, and 14.80% who were 65 years of age or older.  The median age was 38 years. For every 100 females there were 109.60 males.  For every 100 females age 18 and over, there were 110.20 males.

Almost everyone that lives in Huntingdon County speaks English as their first language. The dominant form of speech in Huntingdon County is the Central Pennsylvania accent of English. In some areas of the county, such as Kishacoquillas Valley, where many Amish and Mennonite people live, a dialect of German known as Pennsylvania Dutch (from Deutsch, the word for German) is commonly spoken.

2020 Census

Micropolitan Statistical Area

The United States Office of Management and Budget has designated Huntingdon County as the Huntingdon, PA Micropolitan Statistical Area (µSA).  As of the 2010 census the micropolitan area ranked 11th most populous in the State of Pennsylvania and the 249th most populous in the United States with a population of 45,913.

Law and government

|}

County Commissioners
Mark Sather (chair) (R)
Scott Walls (R)
Jeffrey Thomas (D)

State Senate
 Judy Ward, Republican, Pennsylvania's 30th Senatorial District

State House of Representatives
 Jim Gregory, Republican, Pennsylvania's 80th Representative District
 Rich Irvin, Republican, Pennsylvania's 81st Representative District

United States House of Representatives
 John Joyce, Republican, Pennsylvania's 13th congressional district

United States Senate
 John Fetterman, Democrat
 Bob Casey Jr., Democrat

Education

Public school districts
 Huntingdon Area School District
 Juniata Valley School District
 Mount Union Area School District (also in Mifflin County)
 Southern Huntingdon County School District 
 Tussey Mountain School District (also in Bedford County)
 Tyrone Area School District (also in Blair and Centre Counties)

Related entities
 Huntingdon County Career and Technology Center: Mill Creek
 Tuscarora Intermediate Unit 11

Charter schools
 New Day Charter School (7–12): Huntingdon 
 Stone Valley Community Charter School (K–5): McAlevy's Fort

Private schools
 Calvary Christian Academy: Huntingdon
 Class School: Mill Creek
 Grier School: Birmingham
 Huntingdon Christian Academy: Huntingdon
 Huntingdon County Child & Adult Development Center
 Meadow Green Mennonite School: Three Springs
 Shavers Creek Christian School: Petersburg
 Tiny Tots Childcare and Learning Center: Shade Gap
 West Penn F Grace Brethren: Saxton
 Woodcock Valley Center on Children: Huntingdon

Colleges and universities
 Juniata College, a small, independent liberal arts college, is located in the county seat of Huntingdon.
 DuBois Business College, Huntingdon County campus, located in the former Huntingdon High School building in the borough of Huntingdon.
 Pennsylvania Highlands Community College, Huntingdon center (located in Walker Township)

Libraries
 Huntingdon County Library
 Memorial Public Library of the Borough of Alexandria
 Mount Union Community Library

Transportation

Major highways

Media

Radio stations

AM
 ESPN RADIO 1150 AM: Huntingdon (Sports)
 WIEZ 670 AM: Lewistown (News/Talk)
 WMAJ 1450 AM: State College (Sports)
 WVAM 1430 AM: Altoona (Sports)
 WFBG 1290 AM: Altoona (News/Talk)
 WKMC 1370 AM: Roaring Spring (Nostalgia)
 WRTA 1240 AM: Altoona (News/Talk)
 WRSC 1390 AM: State College (News/Talk)
 WBLF 970 AM: Bellefonte (News/Talk)
 WPHB 1260 AM: Philipsburg (Country)
 WKVA 920 AM: Burnham (Oldies)
 WHP 580 AM: Harrisburg (News/Talk)
 KDKA 1020 AM: Pittsburgh (heard much better at night) (News/Talk)
 WWVA 1170 AM: Wheeling, West Virginia- (heard much better at night) (News/Talk/Country)
 WGY 810 AM: Schenectady, New York (heard much better at night) (News/Talk)

FM
 WHUN 103.5 FM: Huntingdon (Oldies)
 WDBF 106.3 FM: Selinsgrove (Country)
 WKVR 92.3 FM: Huntingdon (College)
 W273BE 102.5 FM: Huntingdon (Public Radio)
 WFGY 98.1 FM: Altoona (Country)
 WFGE 101.1 FM: Tyrone (Country)
 WBUS 93.7 FM: State College (Classic Rock)
 WWOT 100.1 FM: Altoona (Top 40)
 WJOW 105.9 FM: Philipsburg (Country)
 WSKE 104.3 FM: Everett (Country)
 WJSM 92.7 FM: Martinsburg (Religious)
 WHPA 93.5 FM: Gallitzin (Oldies)
 WBRX 94.7 FM: Cresson (Adult Contemporary)
 WRXV 89.1 FM: State College (Christian Contemporary)
 WTLR 89.9 FM: State College (Religious)
 WRKY 104.9 FM: Hollidaysburg (Classic Rock)
 WRKW 99.1 FM: Ebensburg (Classic Rock)
 WFGI 95.5 FM: Johnstown (Country)
 WVNW 96.7 FM: Burnham (Country)
 WCHX 105.5 FM: Burnham (Classic Rock)
 WQWK 103.1 FM: State College (Classic Rock)
 WLTS 99.5 FM: Centre Hall (Classic Hits)
 WPSU 91.5 FM: State College (Public Radio)

Newspapers
 The Daily News

Television
 CBS: WTAJ-TV, Altoona
 ABC: WATM-TV, Johnstown
 Fox: WWCP-TV, Johnstown
 NBC: WJAC-TV, Johnstown
 PBS: WPSU-TV, State College
 CW: WPCW, Jeannette

Communities

Under Pennsylvania law, there are four types of incorporated municipalities: cities, boroughs, townships, and, in at most two cases, towns. The following boroughs and townships are located in Huntingdon County:

Boroughs

Alexandria
Birmingham
Broad Top City
Cassville
Coalmont
Dudley
Huntingdon (county seat)
Mapleton
Marklesburg
Mill Creek
Mount Union
Orbisonia
Petersburg
Rockhill
Saltillo
Shade Gap
Shirleysburg
Three Springs

Townships

Barree
Brady
Carbon
Cass
Clay
Cromwell
Dublin
Franklin
Henderson
Hopewell
Jackson
Juniata
Lincoln
Logan
Miller
Morris
Oneida
Penn
Porter
Shirley
Smithfield
Springfield
Spruce Creek
Tell
Todd
Union
Walker
Warriors Mark
West
Wood

Census-designated places
Allenport
McConnellstown

Unincorporated communities
Calvin
Entriken

Population ranking
The population ranking of the following table is based on the 2010 census of Huntingdon County.

† county seat

Notable people
Dylan Lane (born 1977), game show host (hosted Chain Reaction) (born in Tyrone, Blair County, spent whole life in Huntingdon)
Isabel Stewart North (1860-1929), composer
Robert Elliott Speer (1867–1947), American religious leader
Martin Grove Brumbaugh (1862–1930), 26th Governor of Pennsylvania
Horace Porter (1837–1921), Civil War general and US diplomat
John Purdue (born October 31, 1802, in Huntingdon County), primary original benefactor of Purdue University
Hugh Brady (born July 29, 1768, in Standingstone), U.S. Army general

See also
 National Register of Historic Places listings in Huntingdon County, Pennsylvania

References

External links
 Huntingdon County official website
 Huntingdon County Chamber of Commerce official website
 Huntingdon County Business & Industry
 Huntingdon County Visitors Bureau official website
 Huntingdon County Community Website
 Huntingdon County, Pennsylvania detailed profile at City-Data.com
 Community Events and Business Directory for Huntingdon County, Pa

 
1787 establishments in Pennsylvania
Populated places established in 1787
Counties of Appalachia